Peptide hormones are hormones whose molecules are peptide. Peptide hormones have shorter amino acid chain lengths than protein hormones. These hormones have an effect on the endocrine system of animals, including humans. Most hormones can be classified as either amino acid–based hormones (amine, peptide, or protein) or steroid hormones. The former are water-soluble and act on the surface of target cells via second messengers; the latter, being lipid-soluble, move through the plasma membranes of target cells (both cytoplasmic and nuclear) to act within their nuclei.

Like all peptides, peptide hormones are synthesized in cells from amino acids according to mRNA transcripts, which are synthesized from DNA templates inside the cell nucleus. Preprohormones, peptide hormone precursors, are then processed in several stages, typically in the endoplasmic reticulum, including removal of the N-terminal signal sequence and sometimes glycosylation, resulting in prohormones. The prohormones are then packaged into membrane-bound secretory vesicles, which can be secreted from the cell by exocytosis in response to specific stimuli (e.g. an increase in Ca2+ and cAMP concentration in cytoplasm).

These prohormones often contain superfluous amino acid residues that were needed to direct folding of the hormone molecule into its active configuration but have no function once the hormone folds. Specific endopeptidases in the cell cleave the prohormone just before it is released into the bloodstream, generating the mature hormone form of the molecule. Mature peptide hormones then travel through the blood to all of the cells of the body, where they interact with specific receptors on the surfaces of their target cells.

Some neurotransmitters are secreted and released in a similar fashion to peptide hormones, and some "neuropeptides" may be used as neurotransmitters in the nervous system in addition to acting as hormones when released into the blood.

When a peptide hormone binds to a receptor on the surface of the cell, a second messenger appears in the cytoplasm, which triggers signal transduction leading to the cellular responses.

Some peptides (angiotensin II, basic fibroblast growth factor-2, parathyroid hormone-related protein) also interact with intracellular receptors located in the cytoplasm or nucleus by an intracrine mechanism.

List of peptide hormones in humans 

 adrenocorticotropic hormone (ACTH)
 adropin
 amylin
 angiotensin
 atrial natriuretic peptide (ANP)
 calcitonin
 cholecystokinin (CCK)
 gastrin
 ghrelin
 glucagon
 growth hormone
 follicle-stimulating hormone (FSH)
 insulin
 leptin
 luteinizing hormone (LH)
 melanocyte-stimulating hormone (MSH)
 oxytocin
 parathyroid hormone (PTH)
 prolactin
 renin
 somatostatin
 thyroid-stimulating hormone (TSH)
 thyrotropin-releasing hormone (TRH)
 vasopressin, also called arginine vasopressin (AVP) or anti-diuretic hormone (ADH)
 vasoactive intestinal peptide (VIP)

References

Peptide hormones
Proteins